Super Hero is a 2018 Bangladeshi action drama film. The film was directed by Ashiqur Rahman and produced by Taposhi Farooq. The film distributed by Heartbeat Production. It features Shakib Khan and Shabnom Bubly in lead roles, and Tiger Robi, Shampa Reza and Tariq Anam Khan in other roles.

It is the first Bangladeshi film to have been filmed in Australia.

Cast 
 Shakib Khan - Iqbal Mahmud Sami, a Special Force officer
 Shabnom Bubly - Swapna Miliana Sima, Sami's love interest
 Tiger Robi - Junaid 
 Salman Arif - Pitar
 Sadek Bacchu - Kamal, Sami's father
 Shampa Reza
 Mahmudul Islam Mithu
 Tariq Anam Khan - K.M. Khalil, a Bangladeshi missile specialist scientist
 Cindy Rolling
 Saiful Akbar Sadi

Soundtrack 

The film soundtrack composed by Akassh, Ali Akram Shuvo and Naved Parvez. The first song of film titled "Boom Boom" was released on Live Technologies's YouTube channel on 8 June 2018 as a promotional track. The song sung by Protik Hasan and Shourin written by Sudip Kumar Dip and composed by Naved Parvez.

Release 
The film was released in 80 theatres around the country on 16 June 2018.

Reception 
In the Dhaka Tribune, Rummana Foisal Nafiu found the film entertaining despite a clichéd plot and poor visual effects and audio. Nafiu was especially critical of the out-of-sync dialogue caused by low quality Automated dialogue replacement (ADR).

References

External links 
 
 

Bengali-language Bangladeshi films
2018 films
Films shot in Australia
2018 action drama films
Bangladeshi action drama films
2010s Bengali-language films